Cary Bates (born 1948) is an American comic book, animation, television and film writer. He is best known for his work on The Flash, Superman, Superboy, the Legion of Superheroes and Captain Atom.

Biography

Early career
Bates began submitting ideas for comic book covers to DC Comics at the age of 13, and a number of them were bought and published, the first as the cover to Superman #167 (Feb. 1964). Bates began to sell stories to DC when he was 17.

Bates is best known for his work for DC Comics on such titles as Action Comics, Captain Atom, The Flash, Superboy and the Legion of Super-Heroes, and Superman. He began working for the publisher in 1963 and continued to do so until the early 1990s. Among his contributions to the Superman mythos, he and artist Curt Swan co-created the supervillains Terra-Man and the 1970s version of the Toyman as well as the superhero Vartox. In November 1972, Bates and artist Art Saaf launched the first Supergirl series. Bates wrote two stories which featured a superhero wedding. In Superboy Starring the Legion of Super-Heroes #200 (Feb. 1974), the characters Bouncing Boy and Duo Damsel were married and Justice League of America #121 (Aug. 1975) featured the marriage of Adam Strange and the character's longstanding love interest Alanna. Superman #300 (June 1976) featured an out-of-continuity story by Bates and Elliot S. Maggin which imagined the infant Superman landing on Earth in 1976 and becoming a superhero in 2001. The tale was an inspiration for Mark Millar's Superman: Red Son limited series published in 2003. Bates would end the marriage of another character when he wrote The Flash #275 (July 1979) wherein the title character's wife, Iris West Allen was killed.

Bates appeared in his own comics as himself several times, alongside superheroes such as the Silver Age version of the Flash and the Justice League of America.

1980s
Bates and artist Kurt Schaffenberger were the creative team for The New Adventures of Superboy, a series debuting in January 1980, which took the character out of the Legion of Super-Heroes and back into solo adventures. He and artist Carmine Infantino crafted a Batman backup story for Detective Comics #500 (March 1981). Infantino returned to The Flash title with issue #296 (April 1981) and he and Bates collaborated on the series, including issue #300 (Aug. 1981) which was in the Dollar Comics format, until its cancellation with issue #350 (October 1985). A major shakeup occurred when The Flash would inadvertently kill his wife's murderer, the Reverse-Flash, in The Flash #324 (Aug. 1983). This led to an extended storyline titled "The Trial of the Flash" in which the hero must face the repercussions of his actions. Bates became the editor as well as the writer of The Flash title during this time and oversaw it until its cancellation in 1985. "The Trial of the Flash" was collected in a volume of the Showcase Presents series in 2011.

His final Superman stories were "Trapped in IMP-TV" in Superman #421 and "Superman for a Day" in Action Comics #581 (both cover dated July 1986). Bates was one of the contributors to the DC Challenge limited series in 1986. In 1987 and 1988, he wrote some stories for Marvel Comics' New Universe line and created the Video Jack series at Epic Comics with Keith Giffen. His post-Superman work for DC included a Captain Atom series with Pat Broderick and the Silverblade limited series with Gene Colan.

Later career and other work
His other work includes the comic strips The Lone Ranger (1980–1983), and Buck Rogers in the 25th Century (1981–1983).

Cary Bates was head scriptwriter on the 1988–1992 live action Superboy television series, and co-wrote (with Mario Puzo and John Briley) the 1992 film Christopher Columbus: The Discovery, produced by Superman: The Movie producers Alexander and Ilya Salkind. He also wrote for Disney's Gargoyles during the 1990s.

In 2008 he returned after a 20-year absence to Marvel and wrote True Believers, a limited series about a team trying to uncover secrets in the Marvel Universe.

Bates made a return to writing Superman, this time as an Elseworlds story titled Superman: The Last Family of Krypton, published in August 2010. Bates worked on the DC Comics nostalgic event DC Retroactive writing stories for the one-shot specials DC Retroactive: Flash - The '70s (with art by Benito Gallego and Sal Buscema), and DC Retroactive: JLA - The '70s (drawn by Gordon Purcell and Andy Smith), both released with September 2011 cover dates. 

In 2017, Bates returned to the character Captain Atom and wrote The Fall and Rise of Captain Atom #1–6 together with co-writer Greg Weisman who had also worked with him on many issues of the 1980s Captain Atom series.

In 2023, Bates was interviewed about his career by writer Mark Millar for his YouTube series about comic book creators.

Bibliography
Comics work includes:

Continuity Comics 

 Toyboy #2–6 (1987–1988)

DC Comics

Action Comics (Superman): #354, 356, 358, 366–370, 383–390, 392, 401, 403, 405, 407–408, 410, 412, 414–416, 419, 421–423, 425–428, 430–435, 438–439, 441–442, 444–446, 450, 453–454, 456, 460–466, 468–476, 480–485, 487–499, 501–512, 544, 548–549, 581 (1967–1986)
Adventure Comics (Supergirl): #381–382, 384, 386, 388–389, 391–392, 394, 396; (Vigilante): #426–427; (The Flash): #459–466 (1969–1979)
Captain Atom #1–46, 50, Annual #1–2 (1987–1991)
DC Challenge #11 (1986)
DC Comics Presents #10–11, 15, 73, 82 (1979–1985)
DC Comics Presents: Hawkman #1 (2004)
DC Retroactive: The Flash - The '70s (2011)
DC Retroactive: JLA - The '70s (2011)
DC Science Fiction Graphic Novel #2 (Nightwings) (1985)
DC Special Series (The Flash): #1, 11; (Superman): #5 (1977–1978)
DC Super Stars #12 (1977)
Detective Comics #500 (1981)
The Fall and Rise of Captain Atom #1–6 (2017)
The Flash #179, 206, 209–212, 216, 218–292, 294–305, 307–312, 314–350 (1968–1985)
Hercules Unbound #10–12 (1977)
Heroes Against Hunger #1 (among others) (1986)
House of Mystery #240, 282 (1976–1980)
House of Secrets #144 (1977)
Justice League of America #116, 120–121, 123–124, 138–139 (1975–1977)
The New Adventures of Superboy #1–23, 26–30, 32–33 (1980–1982)
New Guardians #2–12 (1988–1989)
Secret Origins vol. 2 #34, 40 (1988–1989)
Silverblade #1–12 (1987–1988)
Strange Sports Stories #4 (1974)
Superboy (Superboy): #148; (Legion of Super-Heroes): #173, 183–184, 188, 190–193, 195, 197–209, 211, 214–216, 218, 220, 222 (1965–1976)
Supergirl #1–4, 7–10 (1972–1974)
Superman #198, 200–201, 204, 209, 213, 214, 219, 220–221, 223, 230–231, 238, 240, 243, 246, 249–250, 255–259, 261, 263–264, 269, 275, 278–279, 281, 283–284, 288–289, 291, 294, 296–300, 327, 329, 353–369, 372–375, 379–386, 388–392, 401–402, 410, 412–413, 415, 418, 421, Annual #9, 12 (1967–1986)
The Superman Family #166, 169–173, 176–183, 195–198 (1974–1979)
Superman's Girl Friend, Lois Lane #96, 108–109, 112, 120–121, 123–127, 130–132, 134–137 (1969–1974)
Superman's Pal Jimmy Olsen #107, 109, 111, 157 (1967–1973)
Superman Movie Special #1 (Superman III adaptation) (1983)
Superman Special #2 (1983)
Superman: The Last Family of Krypton, #1–3 (2010)
V #1–6, 9–16 (1985–1986)
Weird Western Tales #12–13, 15–17, 19 (1972–1973)
Wonder Woman #206, 213, 215 (1973–1975)
Wonder Woman vol. 2 #26 (1989)
World's Finest Comics #151, 167–169, 174, 176, 178, 180–182, 184, 189–191 (1965–1970)

Marvel Comics
Codename: Spitfire #10 (1987)
Fantastic Four Cosmic-Size Special #1 (2009)
Nightmask #3, 5 (1987)
Spitfire and the Troubleshooters #6–9 (1987)
Star Brand #8–9 (1987)
True Believers #1–5 (2008–2009)
Video Jack #1–6 (1987–1988)

Warren Publishing
Creepy #83, 89, 92, 95, 99–100, 102, 109–111 (1976–1979)
Eerie #81, 96, 99–105, 107–109, 117 (1977–1980)
Vampirella #59, 67, 75, 79–80, 82, 111 (1977–1983)

Screenwriting credits

Television
Jem (1988)
Superboy (1989)
Gargoyles (1995–1997)
Bureau of Alien Detectors (1996)
Mummies Alive! (1997)
RoboCop: Alpha Commando (1998–1999)
Roughnecks: Starship Troopers Chronicles (1999)
Max Steel (2000)
W.I.T.C.H. (2005-2006)

Film
Christopher Columbus: The Discovery (1992)

References

Further reading
Strickler, Dave. Syndicated Comic Strips and Artists, 1924-1995: The Complete Index. Cambria, CA: Comics Access, 1995. .

External links
 
 Cary Bates at Mike's Amazing World of Comics
 Cary Bates at the Unofficial Handbook of Marvel Comics Creators
 

1948 births
American comics writers
American male television writers
American television writers
Comic book editors
Date of birth missing (living people)
DC Comics people
Living people
Screenwriters from Pennsylvania
Silver Age comics creators